The Network of African Science Academies (NASAC) was formed in December 2001 as an independent forum for African science academies to discuss scientific issues of common concern.

Member academies are:
 African Academy of Sciences
 Cameroon Academy of Sciences
 Ghana Academy of Arts and Sciences
 Kenya National Academy of Sciences
 Madagascar's National Academy of Arts, Letters and Sciences
 Nigerian Academy of Science
 l'Académie des Sciences et Techniques du Sénégal
 Academy of Science of South Africa
 Sudan Academy of Sciences
 Tanzania Academy of Sciences
 Uganda National Academy of Sciences
 Zambia Academy of Sciences
 Zimbabwe Academy of Sciences

Statement on climate change
In 2007, the Network of African Science Academies submitted a joint “statement on sustainability, energy efficiency, and climate change” to the leaders meeting at the G8 Summit in Heiligendamm, Germany.

“A consensus, based on current evidence, now exists within the global scientific community that human activities are the main source of climate change and that the burning of fossil fuels is largely responsible for driving this change.”

References 

Africa
African studies
Organizations established in 2001